Bath Place may refer to:

Bath Place, London
Bath Place, Oxford